Heleen Nauwelaers (born 14 March 1996) is a Belgian basketball player for Club Baloncesto Bembibre and the Belgian national team.

She participated at the EuroBasket Women 2017.

References

External links
 
 
 
 

1996 births
Living people
Belgian women's basketball players
Olympic basketball players of Belgium
Basketball players at the 2020 Summer Olympics
Belgian expatriate basketball people in France
Belgian expatriate basketball people in Spain
People from Duffel
Power forwards (basketball)
Sportspeople from Antwerp Province